Minna Marianne Nikkanen (born 9 April 1988, in Somero) is a Finnish pole vaulter. Her personal best vault is 4.60 metres (national record), achieved in August 2015 in Kuortane.

Nikkanen won gold medal in 2007 European Junior Championships (4.35 metres) and silver medal in 2009 European U23 Championships (4.45 metres). She competed at the World Championships in 2007 and in 2009 without reaching the final. She placed 10th in the World Championships in August 2015 with a vault which set the Finnish National Record.

International competitions

Personal best 
Outdoor
 4.60 m (Kuortane 2015)

Indoor
 4.61 m (Växjö 2016)

External links

1988 births
Living people
People from Somero
Finnish female pole vaulters
Athletes (track and field) at the 2012 Summer Olympics
Athletes (track and field) at the 2016 Summer Olympics
Olympic athletes of Finland
World Athletics Championships athletes for Finland
Sportspeople from Southwest Finland